Tsandzile Dlamini is a princess of Eswatini who currently serves as Minister of Home Affairs.

Early life and education
Dlamini is the daughter of King Sobhuza II and Inkhosikati Gogo Mngometulu and the younger sister of King Mswati III. She has a degree in psychology from Boston and a Master's Degree in Archives Administration from India.

Career
Dlamini worked as an archivist. She was appointed as a Member of House of Assembly of Eswatini in 2003, one of the king's ten constitutionally allowed appointments, along with two other brothers. In 2008, she was appointed Minister of Natural Resources and Energy. In 2010, she was named as one of a number of ministers who were allowed to buy 'crown land' at below market value in a "questionable land deal." On 4 November 2013, she was appointed Minister for Home Affairs.

Personal life
Dlamini has been married to Musa Mdluli since 1989 and they have two children. In 2016, the king received a gift of 140 cattle as a bride price for her.

References

Year of birth missing (living people)
Living people
Swazi royalty
Female archivists
Energy ministers of Eswatini
Interior ministers of Eswatini
Natural resources ministers of Eswatini
Female interior ministers
Women government ministers of Eswatini
Daughters of kings